Man in the River is a 1958 West German drama film directed by Eugen York and starring Hans Albers, Gina Albert and Helmut Schmid. It was one of the final appearances of the veteran star Albers.

It was shot at the Spandau Studios in Berlin. The film's sets were designed by the art director Herbert Kirchhoff.

Cast
 Hans Albers as Paul Hinrichs
 Gina Albert as Lena Hinrichs
 Helmut Schmid as Manfred Thelen
 Jochen Brockmann as Kuddel
 Hans Nielsen as Egon Iversen
 Roland Kaiser as Timm Hinrichs
 Carsta Löck as Sekretärin
 Josef Dahmen as Bergungsinspektor Garms
 Wolfgang Völz as Mike
 Ludwig Linkmann as Herr Buchmann
 Joseph Offenbach as Friseur
 Joachim Rathmann as Albert
 Maly Delschaft

References

Bibliography 
 Bock, Hans-Michael & Bergfelder, Tim. The Concise CineGraph. Encyclopedia of German Cinema. Berghahn Books, 2009.

External links 
 

1958 films
1958 crime drama films
German crime drama films
West German films
1950s German-language films
Films directed by Eugen York
Films based on German novels
Films set in Hamburg
Films featuring underwater diving
Films shot at Spandau Studios
1950s German films